300 Grove Bay Residences was a proposed residential development to be located in the Coconut Grove neighborhood of Miami, Florida. The complex was to consist of 3 high-rise buildings, with all three rising at least . Each building in the complex was designed by the Arquitectonica architectural firm and was being jointly developed by Ocean Land Investments and The Related Group of Florida. The towers were originally approved for construction in September 2007 and were expected to be completed by 2010. In May 2008, however, the Miami-Dade Circuit Court nullified the project's approval on grounds of procedural violations and spot zoning. Since its approval was nullified in 2008, the project has neither begun construction nor undergone a redesign, and it is no longer considered an active development.

Approval controversy
The city of Miami approved the construction of 300 Grove Bay Residences in September 2007. This approval was controversial, as opponents of the project argued that the city did not provide them with due legal process to contest the planned development and had thus committed procedural violations. In late 2007, various parties, including the Vizcaya Museum and Gardens and individual Coconut Grove residents, sued the city to block the development's construction. The Vizcaya Museum argued that the approved development would block scenic oceanfront views from the Villa Vizcaya, while local residents felt that the large, high-rise development would be out-of-place in the more suburban Coconut Grove region of Miami.

In May 2008, the Miami-Dade Circuit Court appellate panel nullified the city of Miami's previous approval of the project, citing both procedural violations and noting the "spot zoning" of the three skyscrapers as out of character with the neighborhood. Despite this setback, Ocean Land Investments continues to label the project as an "active proposal." Due to the court's nullification on grounds of spot zoning, the project would likely need to be downsized significantly before seeking re-approval from the city.

High-rises in the development

See also
 List of tallest buildings in Miami

References

External links 
 Official project website
 Outline of project's location

Skyscrapers in Miami
Unbuilt buildings and structures in the United States